Estee  (  and Estée are feminine given names, both diminutives of the name Esther.

It may refer to:
Estée Cattoor (born 2004), Belgian footballer
Estée Lauder (1908-2004), American entrpreneur and namesake of Estée Lauder Companies
Estee Portnoy, American business executive
Estee Shiraz, American-Israeli entrepreneur, communication expert and mediator

See also
Esti (given name)

Notes

Hebrew feminine given names